Saldenburg is a municipality in the district of Freyung-Grafenau in Bavaria in Germany.

The municipality comprises the following 30 villages and locations:

References

Freyung-Grafenau